The Ultimate Fighter: Team Peña vs. Team Nunes (also known as The Ultimate Fighter 30 and TUF 30) is a 2022 installment of the Ultimate Fighting Championship (UFC)-produced reality television series The Ultimate Fighter on ESPN+. Former UFC women's bantamweight champion and current UFC women's featherweight champion Amanda Nunes and UFC women's bantamweight champion Julianna Peña will coach the season of TUF and the show will feature contestants at heavyweights and women's flyweights will be featured on the season. The pair was initially expected to meet on August 7, 2021 at UFC 265 in a title bout, However, Nunes tested positive for COVID-19 on July 29 and the bout was cancelled. The fight was rescheduled and eventually took place at UFC 269 on December 11, 2021 where Peña won the championship by submitting Nunes. The two coaches met again for the bantamweight title at UFC 277. Where Nunes regained her title in a unanimous decision.

The UFC officially announced the TUF 30 to be broadcast by ESPN+ starting May 3, 2022.

Cast

Coaches

  Team Peña:
 Julianna Peña, Head Coach

  Team Nunes:
Amanda Nunes, Head Coach

Fighters
Team Peña
Heavyweights: Mohammed Usman, Zac Pauga, Jordan Heiderman and Bobby Maximus.
Women's Flyweights: Helen Peralta, Juliana Miller, Hannah Guy and Chantel Coates (*Laura Gallardo)
Coates was unable to make weight and was replaced on episode 4 by Gallardo.

Team Nunes
Heavyweights: Eduardo Perez, Chandler Cole, Mitchell Sipe and Nyle Bartling.
Women's Flyweights: Claire Guthrie, Brogan Walker-Sanchez, Kaytlin Neil and Kathryn Paprocki.

Episodes
Episode 1 (May 3, 2022)
Some of the fighters have their last moments with their relatives before officially joining the competition.
Both coaches get a chance to evaluate the fighters before picking teams. They draw strategies regarding their targets.
UFC President Dana White welcome the contestants and coaches at the UFC Apex. He explains that to celebrate the 30th season of the show, he decided to have former UFC Light Heavyweight Champion and The Ultimate Fighter 1 light heavyweight winner Forrest Griffin be a part of the season. He explains the mechanics of how things will work — winners fight at the live finale, winners there will earn UFC contracts — and explains his path to joining the cast for the historic inaugural season of the show 18 years ago. He encourages the competitors to make the most of the experience.
Nunes wins the coin toss and chose to pick the first fighter. That means Peña would have the first fight pick and the fighters were picked in the following order:

 The following day is the first day of training and the first fight will be selected as well. Peña chose her No. 2 pick Zac Pauga to take on Team Nunes' No. 4 pick Nyle Bartling in a heavyweight matchup.
 Zac Pauga defeated Nyle Bartling via unanimous decision after two rounds.
 Team Peña retained control of fight selection, and with a women's flyweight bout up next, she selected her No. 1 pick Helen Peralta to fight Nunes' No. 3 pick Kaytlin Neil.

Episode 2 (May 10, 2022)
Bartling struggles with his loss. He and Pauga discuss their fight and feelings outside of it. Meanwhile Kaytling Neil talks about her relationship with Peña outside of the show and experiencing mixed emotions about getting to fight and being tabbed to take on Peña's no. 1 pick, and wants to know the thinking behind making this particular fight.
Two days before the fight, Neil is crying in the dressing room as Nunes and her wife/fellow UFC fighter Nina Nunes arrive. She explains that her father died after a lengthy battle with addiction issues. Neil says to her coaches that she's not worried about the fight, but frustrated and challenged by the timing of things.
 Kaytlin Neil defeated Helen Peralta via split decision after three rounds.
 Team Nunes now has control and selects her No. 3 pick Mitchell Sipe to fight Peña's No. 1 pick Mohammed Usman, setting up a fight that was supposed to happen on the regional circuit a few years ago.

Episode 3 (May 17, 2022)
 Mohammed Usman defeated Mitchell Sipe by unanimous decision

Tournament bracket

Heavyweight bracket

Women's Flyweight bracket

See also 
 List of UFC events
 2022 in UFC
 List of current UFC fighters

References 

The Ultimate Fighter episodes
2020s American reality television series
2022 in mixed martial arts
Sports competitions in Las Vegas